Royal Roads University Student Association (RRUSA) is a not-for-profit organization representing interests of undergraduate students studying at Royal Roads University in Victoria, British Columbia.

History
The organization, independent of Royal Roads University, was established in 1999. In 2015, RRUSA was incorporated under the British Columbia Societies Act.

Initiatives  
In 2012, RRUSA applied for and successfully received 172,700 in funding from the Government of Canada through Status of Women Canada to prevent violence on campus.

See also 
 List of British Columbia students' associations

References

External links

British Columbia students' associations
Students' Union
Student organizations established in 1999